Coal Power Generation Company Bangladesh Limited is a Bangladesh government-owned energy company. The main objective of the company is to generate electricity mainly using coal. The company will undertake any scheme for construction of power plants under the Private Sector Power Generation Policy of Bangladesh, Public-Private Partnership (PPP) Policy or any other policy framework of the government. The prime initiative of the company is to construct a 2X600 MW coal fired power plant at Matarbari and Dhalghata Union in Maheshkhali Upazilla of Cox's Bazar District. This project consists of construction of jetty and coal handling facilities for coal import, coal storage, power plant construction, township development, rural electrification and construction of transmission facilities and road communication. The eco-friendly 2x600MW Matarbari project is scheduled to be in operation in January 2024. Full swing operation of the company shall yield 5000 MW of power to the national grid by 2030. Md. Abdul Mottalib is the current managing director of the company.

History
Coal Power Generation Company Bangladesh Limited is an enterprise of the Government of the People's Republic of Bangladesh. The company was incorporated in Bangladesh on 5 September 2011 as a Public Limited Company with Registrar of Joint Stock Companies & Firms (RJSC) bearing Registration #C-95239/11 under the framework of the Government Power Sector Reform Policy and the provision of the Companies Act, 1994. It is an autonomous company under Ministry of Power, Energy and Mineral Resources. The Government of Bangladesh owns 100% share of the company.

Current Projects of CPGCBL

Matarbari 2x600 MW Ultra Super Critical Coal Fired Power Plant Project 
The prime initiative of Coal Power Generation Company Bangladesh Limited (CPGCBL) is to construct a 2x600 MW Ultra Super Critical Coal Fired Power Plant at Matarbari in Maheshkhali Upazilla of Cox's Bazar District. This project consists of a deep sea port, construction of jetty and coal handling facilities for coal import, coal storage, power plant construction, township development, rural electrification, construction of transmission facilities, and communication roads. Environmental and Social Impact Assessment (ESIA) and Feasibility Study of this project were conducted in the years 2013–2014. A loan agreement between Bangladesh Government & the Japanese International Cooperation Agency (JICA) was signed on 16 June 2014. The estimated project cost as per approved Development Project Proposal (DPP) is Tk. 35,984 crore, among which Tk. 7045 crore is from GoB fund and CPGCBL's fund, rest amount Tk. 28,939 crore as Project Aid from JICA, approximately $359,840,000 USD. 1608 acres of land has already been acquired for the construction of the 2x600 MW Ultra Super Critical Coal Fired Power Plant and the port facility. “Matarbari Joint Venture Consultant (MJVC)” is appointed to act as the Owner's Engineer by CPGCBL. MJVC prepared the technical specifications, drawings of power plant and port facilities, and Bid Document for EPC (Engineering, Procurement and Construction) contractor. The Consortium of Sumitomo Corporation, Toshiba Energy Systems & Solutions Corporation and IHI Corporation (formerly known as Ishikawajima-Harima Heavy Industries Co., Ltd.) is engaged as the EPC contractor for construction of the 2x600 MW Ultra Super Critical Coal Fired Power Plant on 27 July 2017. The EPC Contractor has since began construction on the plant from 22 August 2017. Honourable Prime Minister of the Govt. of the People's Republic of Bangladesh Sheikh Hasina laid down the Foundation Stone on 28 January 2018. At present, Boiler foundation works, the Piling works of Steam Generator-1, the North revetment works, the Pile driving works of the Coal Unloading Jetty, the Construction works of Unloading Jetty for Oil and heavy Equipment, and the Soil improvement works of Embankment by Deep Mixing Method (DMM) are in progress. The land development works at the power project area is ongoing. Moreover, design & drawing review of power plant and port works are also going on. Overall physical progress of the project is 34.00% as against planned cumulated progress of 33.18% till September 2020. Implementation of this project will increase electricity generation, create employment opportunities and develop skilled manpower through transfer towards modern technology.

CPGCBL-Sumitomo 1200 MW USC Coal Fired Power Project 
Coal Power Generation Company Bangladesh Limited (CPGCBL) is also exploring the possibility to setup a 1200 MW Ultra Super Critical Coal Fired Power Plant jointly with Sumitomo Corporation, Japan in the Maheshkhali area. In this aspect, a memorandum of understanding (MoU) has been signed between CPGCBL and Sumitomo Corporation, Japan on 5 October 2017. Partial payment (around 95%) has already been made to DC Office, Cox's Bazar for around 1350 acres of land to establish this power Project. Development Project Proposal (DPP) for Land Acquisition and related activities for Construction of CPGCBL-Sumitomo 1200 MW Ultra Super Critical Coal Fired Power Plant has been approved by Panning Commission on 23 October 2018. Ramboll, UK and Environmental Resources Management (ERM), Japan have been appointed to conduct Technical Feasibility Study (TFS) and Environmental & Social Impact Assessment (ESIA) study respectively. Besides, Sumitomo Mitsui Banking Corporation (SMBC), Japan has also been appointed to conduct Financial Advisory Service (FAS). All the activities of TFS, ESIA and FAS study are going on in full swing.

500-600 MW LNG Based Combined Cycle Power Project 
Coal Power Generation Company Bangladesh Limited (CPGCBL) and Mitsui & Co. Ltd., Japan are seeking to develop jointly imported LNG based gas-fired combined cycle power plants with an approximate capacity of 500MW to 600MW at Matarbari Union, Maheshkhali Upazilla of Cox's Bazar. This plant will be established within the acquired land of Kohelia 700 MW USC Coal Fired Power Project. Development Project Proposal (DPP) for “To Conduct Feasibility Study for installation of 500-600 MW LNG Based Combined Cycle Power Plant along with Gas Transmission Line Construction” was approved on the of 30 October 2018. In order to conduct Environmental and Social Impact Assessment (ESIA) study and Technical Feasibility Study (TFS) contract's have been signed with Environmental Resources Management (ERM), Japan and Tokyo Electric Power Services Co. Ltd. (TEPSCO), Japan respectively on February, 2019. TEPSCO, Japan has submitted a draft Feasibility Study Report and discussion on that report is ongoing. all the activities of ESIA study are fully approved. Moreover, Advisor selection procedure is going on for Financial Advisory Services (FAS). Furthermore, CPGCBL has already taken initiatives for Land Acquisition for construction of the Gas Pipeline associated with this project.

Bangladesh-Singapore 700 MW USC Coal Fired Power Plant 
A 700 MW USC Coal Based Power Plant (1st Phase of Kohelia 2x700 MW USC Coal Fired Power Project) will be constructed by CPGCBL and Kohelia Singapore Holding Private Limited (KSHPL) jointly at Matarbari. To implement this project around 1350 Acres land has already been acquired. Technical Feasibility Study (FS) of this project has been completed and Environmental and Social Impact Assessment (ESIA) study Preparation is in progress. Fichtner GmbH & Co. KG, Germany has been appointed as the Owner's Engineer on May 30, 2018. Final Feasibility Study Report has been submitted to Power Division for approval. Shortly, Joint Venture agreement will be signed between CPGCBL & KSHPL and a project company will be formed to implement the 700 MW USC Coal Based Power Project.

References

External links 
 https://mpemr.gov.bd/power/details/57
 https://cpgcbl.portal.gov.bd/sites/default/files/files/cpgcbl.portal.gov.bd/page/b093da49_d67b_49f0_89cd_aa76a957d387/2020-11-12-09-31-913bd7689bfd7b3123abd287117ee4a9.pdf

Organisations based in Dhaka
Government-owned companies of Bangladesh
Bangladeshi companies established in 2011
Energy companies established in 2011